William Conner Antley (born March 22, 1995) is an American soccer player who plays as a defender for Tampa Bay Rowdies in the USL Championship.

Career

College and amateur teams 
After a standout career with his high school team, East Coweta, Antley played in college for the Mercer Bears. Over the course of his career with Mercer, Antley played in 49 matches, starting 46 of those games, and scored 8 goals and assisted 6 more goals, despite being a defender.

Before his professional career began, Antley played for two USL League Two sides. He began his amateur career with Seattle Sounders FC U-23 team in 2017 where his play gained him recognition as a top 50 player in the league. However, in 2018 he moved to Tormenta FC and played for the team, before they moved to USL League One and transitioned their USL League Two team to Tormenta 2.

South Georgia Tormenta 
Due to his strong form for the team before their move to the professional ranks, Tormenta FC signed Antley to a professional contract on June 11, 2018. Antley made his debut for Tormenta in USL League One's inaugural match against the Greenville Triumph, even scoring a goal. Throughout the season Antley played in 27 matches for Tormenta, scoring 6 goals and making 6 assists for the club. Due to Antley's stellar play throughout the season, Antley was named the 2019 USL League One Defender of the Year on October 29, 2019.

Indy Eleven 
On November 21, 2019, Antley joined USL Championship side Indy Eleven. Notably this was the first transfer between the USL Championship and USL League One where a transfer fee was paid between the clubs for the player. Despite the historic nature of the transfer, the fee was undisclosed.

Tampa Bay Rowdies 
On December 29, 2020, Antley signed with USL Championship side Tampa Bay Rowdies ahead of their 2021 season.

Honors

Individual 

 2019 USL League One Defender of the Year

References

External links
 
 Profile at Mercer University Athletics

1995 births
Living people
People from Coweta County, Georgia
Sportspeople from the Atlanta metropolitan area
Soccer players from Georgia (U.S. state)
American soccer players
Association football defenders
Mercer Bears men's soccer players
Indy Eleven players
Seattle Sounders FC U-23 players
Tampa Bay Rowdies players
Tormenta FC players
USL League One players
USL League Two players
USL Championship players